His Most Faithful Majesty's Council was the privy council of the Kings of Portugal. It was composed of a small group of fidalgos of great social and political importance. 

In political importance, only his Most Faithful Majesty's ministers were above the council, though they were often part of the council as well.

Fidalgos 

A member of the council was called a Fidalgo of His Most Faithful Majesty's Council. If the members of the council did not have a title from Portuguese nobility, he would be addressed as "my Fidalgo" or "my Lord", by his inferiors, and "Counselor" or "Lord Counselor," by his peers in his social scale or higher. Alongside this, a member of His Most Faithful Majesty's Council was granted the styling of Excellency.

References 

1910 disestablishments in Portugal
Kingdom of Portugal
Politics of Portugal
Privy councils